Lt Col John Du Plessis Langrishe FRSE DSO (11 September 1883 – 28 February 1947) was a British physician, soldier and landowner. As a trained physician he was a specialist in public health.

Life

He was born on 11 September 1883 to Amitia (“Amelia”) Sneade Brown and Richard Langrishe (1834-1922). He was the great great grandson of Baronet Hercules Langrishe. He studied medicine at the University of Dublin and graduated MA MBChB around 1905.

In the First World War he served with distinction in the Royal Army Medical Corps, winning the Distinguished Service Order in 1918. After the war he remained in the RAMC and lectured in Tropical Hygiene and Public Health at the University of Edinburgh and served as Chairman of the Edinburgh University Joint Recruiting Board. In 1931 he was elected a Fellow of the Royal Society of Edinburgh. His proposers were Francis Albert Eley Crew, James Hartley Ashworth, Percy Samuel Lelean and Thomas Jones Mackie.

He died on 28 February 1947.

Family

On 6 June 1914 he married Helen Dorothy Collins. They had three children, Philip John Duppa Langrishe, Dorothy Pratt Langrishe and Hugh Richard Langrishe.

References

1883 births
1947 deaths
Royal Army Medical Corps officers
20th-century British medical doctors
Fellows of the Royal Society of Edinburgh
John